Dichomeris cyanoneura is a moth in the family Gelechiidae. It was described by Edward Meyrick in 1922. It is found in Guyana and Pará, Brazil.

The forewings are rather dark chocolate brown, with the costa and veins on the costal area streaked with deep violet blue and the extreme costal edge whitish. The dorsal edge and veins towards the dorsum are less distinctly streaked with violet grey and the median third from the base to the termen is variably streaked or suffused with light ochreous yellowish, leaving darker oval spots of ground colour in the disc before and beyond the middle. The hindwings are rather dark grey.

References

Moths described in 1922
cyanoneura